Eton and Slough was a parliamentary constituency represented in the House of Commons of the Parliament of the United Kingdom. It elected one Member of Parliament (MP) by the first-past-the-post voting system.

History 
The House of Commons (Redistribution of Seats) Act 1944 set up Boundaries Commissions to carry out periodic reviews of the distribution of parliamentary constituencies. It also authorised an initial review to subdivide abnormally large constituencies in time for the 1945 election.  This was implemented by the Redistribution of Seats Order 1945 under which Buckinghamshire was allocated an additional seat.  As a consequence, the new County Constituency of Eton and Slough was formed from the Wycombe constituency, comprising the Municipal Borough of Slough and the Urban and Rural Districts of Eton.

The constituency had some nationally known MPs: Fenner Brockway was a noted internationalist; Anthony Meyer, who later became MP for a constituency in Flintshire, Wales, challenged Prime Minister Margaret Thatcher as a "stalking horse" leadership candidate in 1989; and Joan Lestor, who later served as MP for Eccles, Greater Manchester, was a government minister and a founder of anti-fascist newsletter Searchlight. The seat contained a prestigious public school (Eton College), yet had Labour MPs for most of its history, mostly because of the inclusion of the new town of Slough, which mainly voted for Labour. The sole occasion a Conservative MP won the seat in 1964, was represented by an Old Etonian, Anthony Meyer.

Boundaries and boundary changes
1945–1950: Eton and Slough was established as a County Constituency comprising part of the administrative county of Buckinghamshire. It comprised the southernmost part of that county, consisting of the Municipal Borough of Slough, the Eton Urban District and the Eton Rural District.

1950–1983: As a result of the first general review Eton and Slough became a borough constituency. The Municipal Borough of Slough and the Eton Urban District continued to be in the constituency, but Eton Rural District was transferred to the new South Buckinghamshire constituency.

There were considerable changes in English local government in 1974 with the areas forming the constituency being transferred from Buckinghamshire to Berkshire. However, there were no changes to parliamentary boundaries until 1983. In that year the constituency was abolished, with Eton becoming part of the Windsor and Maidenhead seat and Slough forming the new Slough constituency.

Members of Parliament

Elections

Elections in the 1940s

Elections in the 1950s

This constituency underwent boundary changes between the 1945 and 1950 general elections and thus calculation of change in vote share is not meaningful.

Elections in the 1960s

Elections in the 1970s

References

 Boundaries of Parliamentary Constituencies 1885–1972, compiled and edited by F. W. S. Craig (Political Reference Publications, 1972) 
 British Parliamentary Election Results 1918–1949, compiled and edited by F.W.S. Craig (The Macmillan Press, revised edition, 1977) 
 British Parliamentary Election Results 1950–1973, compiled and edited by F.W.S. Craig (Parliamentary Research Services, 2nd edition, 1983) 
 British Parliamentary Election Results 1974–1983, compiled and edited by F.W.S. Craig (Parliamentary Research Services 1984) 

Government and politics of Slough
Parliamentary constituencies in Buckinghamshire (historic)
History of Slough
Constituencies of the Parliament of the United Kingdom established in 1945
Constituencies of the Parliament of the United Kingdom disestablished in 1983
Eton, Berkshire